In computing, Chord is a protocol and algorithm for a peer-to-peer distributed hash table. A distributed hash table stores key-value pairs by assigning keys to different computers (known as "nodes"); a node will store the values for all the keys for which it is responsible. Chord specifies how keys are assigned to nodes, and how a node can discover the value for a given key by first locating the node responsible for that key.

Chord is one of the four original distributed hash table protocols, along with CAN, Tapestry, and Pastry. It was introduced in 2001 by Ion Stoica, Robert Morris, David Karger, Frans Kaashoek, and Hari Balakrishnan, and was developed at MIT. The 2001 Chord paper won an ACM SIGCOMM Test of Time award in 2011.

Subsequent research by Pamela Zave has shown that the original Chord algorithm (as specified in the 2001 SIGCOMM paper, the 2001 Technical report,
the 2002 PODC paper, and
the 2003 TON paper
) can mis-order the ring, produce several rings, and break the ring.

Overview

Nodes and keys are assigned an -bit identifier using consistent hashing. The SHA-1 algorithm is the base hashing function for consistent hashing. Consistent hashing is integral to the robustness and performance of Chord because both keys and nodes (in fact, their IP addresses) are uniformly distributed in the same identifier space with a negligible possibility of collision. Thus, it also allows nodes to join and leave the network without disruption. In the protocol, the term node is used to refer to both a node itself and its identifier (ID) without ambiguity. So is the term key.

( should be large enough to avoid collision.) Some of these nodes will map to machines or keys while others (most) will be empty.

Each node has a successor and a predecessor. The successor to a node is the next node in the identifier circle in a clockwise direction. The predecessor is counter-clockwise. If there is a node for each possible ID, the successor of node 0 is node 1, and the predecessor of node 0 is node ; however, normally there are "holes" in the sequence. For example, the successor of node 153 may be node 167 (and nodes from 154 to 166 do not exist); in this case, the predecessor of node 167 will be node 153.

The concept of successor can be used for keys as well. Every key is assigned to (stored at) its successor node, so looking up a key  is to query .

Since the successor (or predecessor) of a node may disappear from the network (because of failure or departure), each node records an arc of  nodes in the middle of which it stands, i.e., the list of  nodes preceding it and  nodes following it. This list results in a high probability that a node is able to correctly locate its successor or predecessor, even if the network in question suffers from a high failure rate.

Protocol details

Basic query
The core usage of the Chord protocol is to query a key from a client (generally a node as well), i.e. to find . The basic approach is to pass the query to a node's successor, if it cannot find the key locally. This will lead to a  query time where  is the number of machines in the ring.

Finger table
To avoid the linear search above, Chord implements a faster search method by requiring each node to keep a finger table containing up to  entries, recall that  is the number of bits in the hash key. The  entry of node  will contain . The first entry of finger table is actually the node's immediate successor (and therefore an extra successor field is not needed).

(See proof below.)

Node join
Whenever a new node joins, three invariants should be maintained (the first two ensure correctness and the last one keeps querying fast):
 Each node's successor points to its immediate successor correctly.
 Each node's finger table should be correct.

To satisfy these invariants, a predecessor field is maintained for each node. As the successor is the first entry of the finger table, we do not need to maintain this field separately any more. The following tasks should be done for a newly joined node :
 Initialize node  (the predecessor and the finger table).
 Notify other nodes to update their predecessors and finger tables.
 The new node takes over its responsible keys from its successor.

As for its finger table, there are various initialization methods. The simplest one is to execute find successor queries for all  entries, resulting in  initialization time. A better method is to check whether  entry in the finger table is still correct for the  entry.

Stabilization
To ensure correct lookups, all successor pointers must be up to date. Therefore, a stabilization protocol is running periodically in the background which updates finger tables and successor pointers.

The stabilization protocol works as follows:
 Stabilize(): n asks its successor for its predecessor p and decides whether p should be n's successor instead (this is the case if p recently joined the system).
 Notify(): notifies n's successor of its existence, so it can change its predecessor to n
 Fix_fingers(): updates finger tables

Potential uses
Cooperative Mirroring: A load balancing mechanism by a local network hosting information available to computers outside of the local network.  This scheme could allow developers to balance the load between many computers instead of a central server to ensure availability of their product.
Time-shared storage: In a network, once a computer joins the network its available data is distributed throughout the network for retrieval when that computer disconnects from the network.  As well as other computers' data is sent to the computer in question for offline retrieval when they are no longer connected to the network.  Mainly for nodes without the ability to connect full-time to the network.
Distributed Indices: Retrieval of files over the network within a searchable database.  e.g. P2P file transfer clients.
Large scale combinatorial searches: Keys being candidate solutions to a problem and each key mapping to the node, or computer, that is responsible for evaluating them as a solution or not. e.g. Code Breaking
Also used in wireless sensor networks for reliability

Proof sketches

With high probability, Chord contacts  nodes to find a successor in an -node network.

Suppose node  wishes to find the successor of key . Node  will examine its finger table and route the request to the closest predecessor of  that it has. Call this node .

Because nodes are distributed uniformly at random along the identifier circle, the expected number of nodes falling within an interval of this length is 1, and with high probability, there are fewer than  such nodes. Because the message always advances by at least one node, it takes at most  steps for a message to traverse this remaining distance. The total expected routing time is thus .

If Chord keeps track of  predecessors/successors, then with high probability, if each node has probability of 1/4 of failing, find_successor (see below)  and find_predecessor (see below) will return the correct nodes

Pseudocode
Definitions for pseudocode
finger[k] first node that succeeds 
successor the next node from the node in question on the identifier ring
predecessor the previous node from the node in question on the identifier ring

The pseudocode to find the successor node of an id is given below:

 // ask node n to find the successor of id
 n.find_successor(id)
     // Yes, that should be a closing square bracket to match the opening parenthesis.
     // It is a half closed interval.
     if id ∈ (n, successor] then
         return successor
     else
         // forward the query around the circle
         n0 := closest_preceding_node(id)
         return n0.find_successor(id)
 
 // search the local table for the highest predecessor of id
 n.closest_preceding_node(id)
     for i = m downto 1 do
         if (finger[i] ∈ (n, id)) then
             return finger[i]
     return n

The pseudocode to stabilize the chord ring/circle after node joins and departures is as follows:

 // create a new Chord ring.
 n.create()
     predecessor := nil
     successor := n
 
 // join a Chord ring containing node n'.
 n.join(n')
     predecessor := nil
     successor := n'.find_successor(n)
 
 // called periodically. n asks the successor
 // about its predecessor, verifies if n's immediate
 // successor is consistent, and tells the successor about n
 n.stabilize()
     x = successor.predecessor
     if x ∈ (n, successor) then
         successor := x
     successor.notify(n)
 
 // n' thinks it might be our predecessor.
 n.notify(n')
     if predecessor is nil or n'∈(predecessor, n) then
         predecessor := n'
 
 // called periodically. refreshes finger table entries.
 // next stores the index of the finger to fix
 n.fix_fingers()
     next := next + 1
     if next > m then
         next := 1
     finger[next] := find_successor(n+2);
 
 // called periodically. checks whether predecessor has failed.
 n.check_predecessor()
     if predecessor has failed then
         predecessor := nil

See also
 Kademlia
 Koorde
 OverSim - the overlay simulation framework
 SimGrid - a toolkit for the simulation of distributed applications -

References

External links
The Chord Project (redirect from: http://pdos.lcs.mit.edu/chord/)
Open Chord - An Open Source Java Implementation
Chordless - Another Open Source Java Implementation
jDHTUQ- An open source java implementation. API to generalize the implementation of peer-to-peer DHT systems. Contains GUI in mode data structure

Articles with example pseudocode
Distributed data storage
Software using the MIT license